The 2021 Dalian Professional F.C. season was the 12th season in club history. The team relegated to China League One once again after this season.

Overview

Preseason 
Dalian Pro regrouped on 18 January for winter training at the team base. The original training plan was to train in Guangzhou, but could not be carried on as the manager yet decided to return.

The 2021 CSL saw growing pressure from three aspects. Firstly, strong COVID-prevention policies remained active, that foreign players and staff had to follow quarantine rules when entering or re-entering the border, and that teams would be concentrated into one or more cities for an enclosed, COVID-safe league. Secondly, teams participating the 2021 CSL must have neutral club names, which resulted in far less sponsorship income. Strict salary limitation was also adopted in this season. Although Dalian Pro had already switched to neutral name in the previous season, the team was still vulnerable against other policies, as football stars and manager decided to leave. On 23 January, Benitez announced through his personal website that he had parted ways with Dalian Pro. On 15 February, Rondon was loaned to CSKA Moscow until the end of the 2020-21 RPL season. On 9 March, Hamsik signed with IFK Göteborg.

Dalian Pro had a short break for the Spring Festival, and regrouped on 16 February. Since February, the team stayed in Dalian for training and friendly matches with nearby teams, Liaoning football team for the 2021 National Games of China and Shenyang Urban. The team would move to Guangzhou on 23 March for further friendly matches against other CSL teams.

On 1 April, the 2021 CSL fixtures and details were confirmed and published. League would be divided to 3 phases. Phase 1 begins from 20 April until 17 May, then pause to prepare for the World Cup Qualification. P2 would be from 21 June to 5 August, and P3 from 24 October to 1 December.

April–May
The squad and manager of Dalian Pro was officially made public on 18 April, although sources had already reported the major changes.  The team arrived in Suzhou the same day. As of April,  Danielson was the only foreign player in squad, although the team registered all of them. Boateng did not return in time due to visa issues after his national team matches. Jailson, like a few other Brazilian players, had difficulties acquiring visas due to the pandemic situation in Brazil. Swedish media reported rumors between Larsson and IFK Göteborg, but he later clarified personally that he was affected by COVID-19, and was unable to return to China at the time.

The team struggled with single foreign player Danielson, and saw their first win on 11 May against Tianjin with his precious subsequent shot during a corner.

Interval 1
Boateng finally arrived in China in June. He would join the team in July after quarantine.

Stage 2 matches were due to begin on 22 June after the World Cup qualification second round. As the matches were unexpectedly rearranged to the Emirates instead of China due to multiple reasons, the league reached a consensus to postpone the schedule, as national players had to follow quarantine rules after travelling abroad.

In July, the fixtures were revised and shortened to 22 rounds. The 2021 CSL would finish its Stage 1 on 12 August, then enter an unprecedented 4-month sacrificial pause for the World Cup qualification third round, and conduct its Stage 2 from 1 December until January 2022.

July–September
Although it was widely believed that Rondon would leave after he returned from loan, Dalian Pro surprisingly registered for him before the summer transfer window closed. Nevertheless, he rejoined Benitez at Everton right before the summer window closed.

The team kept struggling at the bottom of the group. Although Lin Liangming emerged as the best scorer in squad, and Danielson returned from the UEFA Euro on time, the team still suffered from lack of foreign players, and entered the relegation group without much surprise. The only good news was that, Larsson, after a few months of recovery, gained access for travelling back to China.

Interval 2
Wang Jinxian's goal against China U-20 in the FA cup was recognized as the club's 500th goal in history.

Lin Liangming had a rib fracture during the training, causing him to miss the rest of the season.

December, season ending
Larsson scored a free kick in the first match upon his returning, making a good start for the team in the relegation group. In the following matches, multiple players suffered from injuries, and Dalian Pro fell behind to 15th after 3 consecutive losses. Although Dalian achieved the biggest win this season by 4–1 against Qingdao, they still finished the season at 15th, and eventually beaten by Chengdu Rongcheng in the relegation playoff.

Summary

Dalian Pro struggled throughout this season due to a lineup too thin to withstand fragmented but intense schedules.

During the first stage, Danilson was the only foreign player in squad. Shan Huanhuan's contribution was not enough for the team's offensive side, resulting only 2 wins out of the total 14. Boateng returned in June, but his support could not make much difference. On the other hand, Lin Liangming's performance was beyond expectation, scoring 5 goals out of total 12. However, he suffered from rib fracture before the second stage, while led to further troubles for Dalian Pro.

As the second stage draws near, Dalian Pro could finally come up with 3 starting foreign players, despite the fact that most CSL teams have another for substitution. In the first 4 matches, the team acquired 3 victories by better stamina and spirit than the opponents, that most media believed that Dalian Pro could flee from relegation zone. Desperate time came when intense schedule brought injuries to starting players. Dong Yanfeng, Danielson, Wu Wei and Boateng all had muscle issues,  and in the next 3 matches, Dalian Pro was lagged back into the relegation area, and eventually lost in the relegation playoffs.

Squad

First team squad

Coaching staff

Transfers

Pre-season

In

Out

Mid-season

In

Out

Friendlies 
Preseason

Interval 1

Interval 2

Chinese Super League

Stage 1 – group B (Suzhou Stadia)

Group B standings

Results summary

Positions by round

Fixtures and results

Stage 2 – relegation group

Relegation group standings

Results summary

Positions by round

Fixtures and results

Relegation playoff

Chinese FA Cup

FA Cup fixtures and results

Quarter finals

Squad statistics

Appearances and goals

Goalscorers

Disciplinary record

Suspensions

References 

Dalian Professional F.C. seasons
Dalian Professional F.C.